Director of Secondary Education, Haryana  (Hindi: माध्यमिक शिक्षा विभाग, हरियाणा) is a unit of the Government of Haryana  in India that looks after the school education in the state of Haryana.

History 
In 1966, when Haryana state was carved out of Punjab there arose a need of separate department of Forests. So, in 1966, a separate Department of Secondary School Education was established for Haryana.

Introduction 
The department is responsible for hiring and employing the secondary school teachers for the Government schools of Government of Haryana. The department also runs the Haryana Board of School Education that conducts the school leaving examinations.

See also
  
List of institutions of higher education in Haryana
Rajiv Gandhi Education City, Sonipat
 Department of Elementary Education, Haryana Official website
 Department of School Education, Haryana Official website
 Department of Higher Education, Haryana Official website
 Haryana Board of School Education Official website
 State Counselling Board (SCB), Haryana for admission to the technical courses Official website
 Overseas Placement Assistance Society (OPAS), Haryana 
 Haryana Tourism
 Haryana Roadways

References

External links

Education in Haryana
State agencies of Haryana
Government agencies established in 1966
1966 establishments in Haryana